XHCORO-FM is a radio station on 98.7 FM in Loma Bonita, Oaxaca, serving Tuxtepec. XHCORO is owned by the Lopezlena family and carries its Ke Buena grupera format from Radiópolis.

History
XHCORO began as XEQF-AM 1470, awarded in 1979 to Radio Loma, S.A. On June 20, 1996, XEQF became XECORO-AM, around the time the station moved to 750 kHz.

In 2011, XECORO moved to FM as XHCORO-FM 98.7.

References

Radio stations in Oaxaca